Saint-Joseph-des-Érables is a municipality in the Municipalité régionale de comté Beauce-Centre in Quebec, Canada. It is part of the Chaudière-Appalaches region and the population is 377 as of 2021.

Saint-Joseph-des-Érables lies on the western bank of the Chaudière River, facing Saint-Joseph-de-Beauce, from which it has split in 1938. "Érables" refers to the large presence of maple trees on the municipality's territory.

Demographics
Population trend:
 Population in 2021: 377 (2016 to 2021 population change: -8%)
 Population in 2016: 410
 Population in 2011: 420
 Population in 2006: 417
 Population in 2001: 460
 Population in 1996: 455

Private dwellings occupied by usual residents: 148 (total dwellings: 154)

References

Commission de toponymie du Québec
Ministère des Affaires municipales, des Régions et de l'Occupation du territoire

Municipalities in Quebec
Incorporated places in Chaudière-Appalaches